A penumbral lunar eclipse took place on Wednesday, February 21, 1951. This was 6.4 days after the Moon reached apogee.

Grazing penumbral eclipse
The magnitude of the eclipse was 0.007 or a miss depending on definitions of the penumbral shadow is defined. Bao-Lin Lui's Canon of lunar eclipses list it as the last eclipse of a saros cycle, with magnitude 0.007, while NASA lists February 10, 1933, as the final series event, with this one missing the shadow.

As seen from the lunar south pole the sun missing the sphere of the earth, excluding the atmosphere.

Related lunar eclipses

Lunar year series

Metonic cycle (19 years) 

This is the third of five Metonic lunar eclipses.

See also 
List of lunar eclipses
List of 20th-century lunar eclipses
August 2016 lunar eclipse
October 2042 lunar eclipse

Notes

References
 Bao-Lin Lui, Alan D. Fiala, Canon of lunar eclipses 1500BC-3000AD, 1992, p. 157, no. 8397, magnitude 0.007.

External links 
 NASA chart
 

1951-02
1951 in science